Chainalytics is a global supply chain consulting, analytics, and market intelligence firm with locations across North America, Europe, and Asia-Pacific.

History

Early Years

Acquisitions 
2011:Packaging Solutions Business From Adalis Corporation; The Adalis packaging engineering services and consulting team, located in Minnesota, formed a new practice within Chainalytics to focus on optimizing supply chain packaging and reducing package damage, materials and logistics costs. Tom Blanck joined as Principal of packaging optimization practice.
2011: Chainnovations, a supply chain management consultancy; This company brought experience in the area of service supply chains, encompassing reverse logistics, after-sales service, and service-centric networks. Chainnovations’ founder and managing partner, Irv Grossman, joined as vice president for Supply Chain Operations Practice.
2013: ROCE Partners,a pan-European supply chain management consultancy with offices in Helsinki, Milan, and Stockholm; With the addition, Chainalytics expanded its geographic coverage and gained capabilities in the areas of sales and operations planning (S&OP) and demand-supply planning.  Janne Salmi, former Chairman of the Board at ROCE Partners, continued as Managing Director of Chainalytics Europe and lead of the global S&OP Practice.
2014: Logiworx, Australian Supply Chain & Logistics Firm; Since 2009, Chainalytics and Logiworx had partnered in multiple supply chain management projects in the Asia-Pacific region. Through acquisitions, Chainalytics gained expertise in verticals such as mining, metals, oil and gas, as well as extending capacity in supply management and procurement of direct and indirect materials. Logiworx partner and co-founder Tim Foster took on the role of Managing Director for Asia-Pacific.

Executive Team 
Irv Grossman, Chief Executive Officer 
Erik Diks, Managing Director, Europe
Ken Justin, Chief Technology Officer
Steve Ellet, Senior Vice President, Supply Chain Design
Neelesh Asati, Managing Director, Asia-Pacific

Offices

North America 

Atlanta, GA
Minneapolis, MN

Asia Pacific 

Bengaluru, India

Europe

Amsterdam, Netherlands
Tampere, Finland
Milan, Italy

References 

Supply chain analytics
Packaging companies